Chaca burmensis is a species of angler catfish endemic to Myanmar, where it is found in the Sittang River and possibly the Ayeyarwady drainage.  This species grows to a length of 20.0 cm (7.9 inches).

References 

Chacidae
Endemic fauna of Myanmar
Taxa named by Barbara A. Brown
Taxa named by Carl J. Ferraris Jr.
Fish described in 1988